Marc Mayrand is a Canadian public servant who served as the sixth chief electoral officer of Canada from 2007 to 2016, where he oversaw Elections Canada.

Career 
Mayrand studied law at the University of Ottawa and the London School of Economics.

He taught briefly, then joined the national Office of the Superintendent of Bankruptcy in 1982, and stayed until 2007.  He rose to the top job there in 1997.

In 2007, he was appointed Chief Electoral Officer of Elections Canada, an independent agency of the Parliament of Canada responsible for supervising the election campaign financing and voting methods. He refused to alter the voting procedure to require Muslim women to remove their veils, as it was not a requirement under the Canada Elections Act.

In 2011, he called on Parliament to revamp the current election laws, which include lifting the blackout of television and radio election coverage in areas where polls are still open, due to the expansion of the use of social media, citing that "its very intelligibility and usefulness in a world where the distinction between private communication and public transmission is quickly eroding."

Mayrand announced that he was stepping down from his position as of December 28, 2016 in order to allow his successor to be involved in any changes the government should choose to make to the voting system in Canada.

References

Living people
Chief Electoral Officer (Canada)
People from Trois-Rivières
University of Ottawa alumni
Alumni of the London School of Economics
University of Ottawa Faculty of Law alumni
Year of birth missing (living people)